Crystal Lewis is the fourteenth studio album by Crystal Lewis. Metro 1 Music released the album on September 11, 2015 which was the same day as her birthday.

Critical reception

Awarding the album four stars from CCM Magazine, Andy Argyrakis states, "Lewis is firmly planted in the here and now." Andrew Wallace, indicating in a nine out of ten review by Cross Rhythms, describes, "A fresh, invigorating listen from an artist still relevant and at the top of her game."

Bert Saraco, rating the album a four out of five at The Phantom Tollbooth, writes, "her self-titled project is a very strong performance full of funk and power, with every word of every lyric plumbed for all its worth." Giving the album three and a half stars for The Christian Beat, Sarah Baylor says, "This record has an uplifting and soulful vibe that leaves you wanting to listen to the album again and again."

Track listing

Personnel
 Crystal Lewis – vocals 
 Jimmy Wallace – keyboards (1–3, 6–8, 11)
 David Vandervelde – clavinet (1–3, 6–8, 11), guitars (1–3, 6–8, 11)
 Elijah Thompson – synthesizers (1–3, 6–8, 11), guitars (1–3, 6–8, 11), bass (1–3, 6–8, 11), bell tree (1–3, 6–8, 11)
 Joel Goodwin – keyboards (4), synth bass (4)
 Blaine Stark – Hammond B3 organ (10), programming (10), additional guitars (10)
 Jared Rich – additional keyboards (10)
 James Raymond – acoustic piano (11)
 Shawn Tubbs – guitars 
 Nic Rodriguez – bass (4, 5, 9, 10)
 Frank Lenz – drums (1–3, 6–8, 11), percussion (1–3, 6–8, 11), horn arrangements (8)
 Peace 586 – drum beats (4, 5, 9, 10)
 Phil Krawzak – baritone saxophone (8)
 Mark Visher – saxophones (8)
 Tim Rubottom – trumpet (8)
 Anthony Evans – vocals (1)
 Lauren Evans – backing vocals (2, 8)
 Keri Larson – backing vocals (2, 8)
 Brandon Winbush – backing vocals (2, 8)
 Christon Gray – vocals (5)
 Izzy Ray – backing vocals (6)

Production
 Elijah Thompson – producer (1–3, 6–8, 11), recording (1–3, 6–8, 11), mixing (1–3, 6–8, 11)
 Peace 586 – producer (4, 5, 9, 10)
 Nic Rodriguez – recording (4, 5, 9, 10), mixing (4, 5, 9, 10)
 Gavin Lurssen – mastering at Lurssen Mastering (Hollywood, California)
 Andy Prickett – music mentor, advisor 
 Devan Flaherty – artwork 
 Denise Bovee – photography 
 Stanley Hudson – stylist

References

2015 albums
Crystal Lewis albums